Adhia is a surname. Notable people with the surname include:

Hasmukh Adhia (born 1958), Indian banker and government official
Richa Adhia (born 1988), Tanzanian model and beauty pageant contestant